An adonic (Latin: adoneus) is a unit of Aeolic verse, a five-syllable metrical foot consisting of a dactyl followed by a trochee. The last line of a Sapphic stanza is an adonic. The pattern (with "-" a long and "u" a short syllable) is: "- u u  - -" when the pattern ends with a spondee (i.e. --) or "  -uu  -u  " if a trochee is intended.

References

External links 
 Say Something Wonderful: Spot the Adonic

Types of verses